Universal Hits-Golden Best is a 2006 compilation album by Shonen Knife.

Track listing

Disc one
"ロケットにのって" (Riding On The Rocket)
"Twist Barbie"
"サイクリングは楽し" (Cycling Is Fun)
"Antonio Baka Guy"
"I Am A Cat"
"Burning Farm"
"コンクリートアニマルズ" (Concrete Animals)
"トマトヘッド" (Tomato Head)
"Brown Mushrooms"
"Cobra Versus Mongoose"
"E.S.P."
"Fruits and vegetables"
"Explosion!"
"コンニチハ" (Konnichiwa)
"すしバーソング" (Sushi Bar Song)
"Cookie Day"
"Wild Life"
"セサミ" (Sesame)
"Nya Nya"
"Chinese Disco"

Disc two
"Space Christmas"
"Milky Way"
"Quavers"
"Goose Steppin’ Mama"
"Till the End of the Day"
"Top of the World"
"Secret Dance"
"Cherry Bomb"
"Wind Your Spring"
"It’s a New Find"
"Mysterious Drug Store"
"飲茶楼で、めちゃうまかろう" (From a yamcha tower, everything gets messed up)
"はみがき" (Toothpaste)
"All I want for Christmas"
"Girl’s Rock"

2006 compilation albums
Shonen Knife compilation albums